Diodon eydouxii, commonly known as the pelagic porcupinefish, is a species of porcupinefish with a circumtropical marine distribution.

Description 
Diodon eydouxii can be distinguished from many related species by its coloration. While its underside is silver to white in color, its back and sides are typically noticeably blue, with numerous small dark spots. The species is smaller than many of its congeners, reaching around 27 cm (10.6 inches) in total length. It is believed that the blue coloration, comparatively fusiform body, smaller size, and falcate fins of D. eydouxii are adaptations to its open-water environment, distinguishing it from non-pelagic (except as juveniles) species such as Diodon hystrix.

Distribution and habitat 
Diodon eydouxii is known from the Atlantic, Pacific, and Indian oceans, where it typically occurs in warm, tropical areas with a water temperature between 23.1 and 29.1 °C (73.6 and 84.4 °F). Unusually among members of the family Diodontidae, and unusually among members of Tetraodontiformes in general, it is a pelagic fish in all stages of its life cycle. It is typically found at depths of 0 to 10 m (0 to 33 ft).

Ecology 
Diodon eydouxii is known to be a schooling species, distinguishing it from many tetraodontiform fish which are often solitary. It reportedly feeds on ichthyoplankton and other larger zooplankton.

Relationship with humans 
Diodon eydouxii is known to be of some importance to minor commercial fisheries. It occasionally appears in the aquarium trade.

References

pelagic porcupinefish
Pantropical fish
pelagic porcupinefish
Taxa named by Charles N. F. Brisout